Jiangwan Township  is a township-level division situated in the Daqing province of Heilongjiang, China.

See also
List of township-level divisions of Heilongjiang

References

Township-level divisions of Heilongjiang